Jingura is a village in Mirzapur, Uttar Pradesh, India.

References

Villages in Mirzapur district